Winston Antonio Parks Tifet (born 12 October 1981) is a Costa Rican former professional footballer who played as a striker.

He previously played in Europe for Udinese, Ascoli, Slovan Liberec, Lokomotiv Moscow, FC Saturn Ramenskoe, Politehnica Timişoara and FC Baku.

Club career 
Winston made his debut in the Costa Rican Primera División in 1999 with only in 17-year-old, playing with his hometown team Limonense and scored his first goal back on 28 November of the same year, he played this season mostly as a substitute, because he was competing at that moment against some players that succeeded during the next few years, like Kurt Bernard, Andy Herron, Rayner Robinson and Ricardo Douglas for a place in the starting line-up. The following season and after the sale of most of the players mentioned before, it was usual to see him in the starting line-up making a dangerous offensive triplet with Victor Núñez and Andy Herron.

His high internationally performances led the Italian club Udinese to purchase the player for $2.1 million from Limonense. However, due to injuries Parks was unable to earn a place in the club's first team, he was loaned for six months to Ascoli and eventually moved on to Lokomotiv Moscow, he was again loaned to FC Saturn Ramenskoe and then he was sold to Slovan Liberec.

After spending six years in Europe he decided to moved back to Costa Rica looking for more minutes on the field in other the get in shape and find again his game and ability. He signed with Alajuelense in summer 2007, but he has had a lot of injuries and only scored two goals in the Apertura's tournament.

Politehnica Timișoara 
He returned to Europa and signed for the Romanian club in summer 2008. Parks made his debut in an away match against FC Argeş where he played just one minute. He scored his first two goals against CS Otopeni in a 2–2 draw. In an away match at Gloria Bistriţa he made his worst match of his career and was criticized by the chairman Marian Iancu and put him on transfer list.

Khazar Lankaran 
On 13 August 2010, he was loaned out to FK Khazar Lankaran with option to buy him at end of the season. He was the goalscorer of the team on 2010–11 season.

FK Baku 
Parks joined Baku from at the start of the 2011–12 season. After 9 goals in 36 appearances in all competitions for Baku, he left the club at the end of the 2012/13 season.

Uruguay Coronado 
In September 2013, Parks joined Costa Rican Primera División side Uruguay Coronado.

Ahead of the 2014 Verano season, Parks moved to second division side Siquirreña and in summer 2014 he returned to his hometown to play for Limón. He joined Santos de Guápiles in January 2015.

International career
Parks gained recognition as an exceptional youth player, appearing in FIFA World Youth Championships U-17 in 1999 held in Nigeria and U-20 in 2001 held in Argentina, and leading Costa Rica during the 2001 U-20 tournament, with four goals.

After making his full national team debut in a November 2001 FIFA World Cup qualification match against Jamaica, he made the roster for the 2002 World Cup, where he appeared in two games as a substitute. Against Turkey he scored the equalizing goal, but failed to score on a second opportunity. he also had a great game against Brazil. His lack of playing time and injuries have, however, resulted in Parks seeing little time during 2006 World Cup qualifying.

He earned a total of 27 caps, scoring 6 goals and represented his country at the 2003 CONCACAF Gold Cup.

His final international was a November 2011 friendly match against Spain.

International goals
Scores and results list. Costa Rica's goal tally first.

Personal life
Parks married Josefina Adriana Rivera on 19 June 2002.

Honours

References

External links
 
 

 
 

1981 births
Living people
People from Limón Province
Association football forwards
Costa Rican footballers
Costa Rica under-20 international footballers
Costa Rica international footballers
2002 FIFA World Cup players
2003 CONCACAF Gold Cup players
Udinese Calcio players
Ascoli Calcio 1898 F.C. players
FC Lokomotiv Moscow players
FC Saturn Ramenskoye players
FC Slovan Liberec players
L.D. Alajuelense footballers
FC Politehnica Timișoara players
Khazar Lankaran FK players
FC Baku players
Santos de Guápiles footballers
Liga FPD players
Russian Premier League players
Czech First League players
Liga I players
Serie B players
Costa Rican expatriate footballers
Expatriate footballers in Italy
Expatriate footballers in Russia
Expatriate footballers in the Czech Republic
Expatriate footballers in Romania
Expatriate footballers in Azerbaijan
Azerbaijan Premier League players